The Conroe Storm was an American indoor football team based out of Conroe, Texas, that played in the American Professional Football League. They were originally slated to play in the Ultimate Indoor Football League before that league's aborted merger with the NAIFL.  After it appeared the NAIFL wouldn't play, they moved to APFL.

In their first season, they finished 2nd in the league but lost at home to the Iowa Blackhawks in the playoffs.  In the 2008 season, they finished in first place in the APFL South Division, however due to league problems and games being cancelled on them, they declined to play in the championship game and withdrew from the league.

Season-by-season

|-
|2007 || 8 || 2 || 0 || 2nd League || Lost Semifinals (Iowa)
|-
|2008 || 8 || 1 || 0 || 1st Southern || No playoff game held, withdrew from championship game
|-
!Totals || 16 || 3 || 0
|colspan="2"| (including playoffs)

External links
Official website

American Professional Football League teams
Conroe, Texas